The English Missal is a translation of the Roman Missal used by some Anglo-Catholic parish churches. After its publication by W. Knott & Son Limited in 1912, The English Missal was rapidly endorsed by the growing Ritualist movement of Anglo-Catholic clergy, who viewed the liturgies of the Book of Common Prayer as insufficient expressions of fully Catholic worship. The translation of the Roman Missal from Latin into the stylized Elizabethan Early Modern English of the Book of Common Prayer allowed clergy to preserve the use of the vernacular language while adopting the Roman Catholic texts and liturgical rubrics.

The only difference in content from the Roman Missal of the time is The English Missal inclusion of certain texts from the Book of Common Prayer, including optional prayers from the ordinary of the Prayer Book's Communion Service and the lessons for Sundays and major feast days from the Prayer Book's lectionary, which was itself taken from the earlier Sarum Use Mass of pre-Reformation England.

After the Public Worship Regulation Act 1874 threatened imprisonment for priests using ritualist liturgical practices, a custom arose of the celebrant saying the Roman Canon in Latin to himself silently (i.e., sotto voce, in a soft voice) in addition to saying the official texts of the Book of Common Prayer aloud. While enforcement of the Public Worship Regulation Act ended in 1906, the custom persisted, due in part to the fact that in the pre-Vatican II Roman Rite the Canon of the Mass was always said silently. For this reason, the Latin text of the Canon of the Mass was included in The English Missal in addition to the English translation.

The English Missal went through five editions. The first four were based on the Roman Missal of Pius V as revised until the time of Pope Pius X. The last edition includes the revised Roman Catholic Holy Week of 1958. One American edition includes material that conforms to the American 1928 Book of Common Prayer.

Influence and legacy
The Swahili liturgy approved for use in the Anglican Diocese of Zanzibar permitted the usage of the English Missal'''s prefaces, these being taken from the 1662 prayer book and the Roman Missal.

In the aftermath of the Second Vatican Council and the subsequent authorization of new typical editions of the Roman Missal with official translations in English, the use of The English Missal has greatly declined. Especially in England, the English version of the Roman Missal is widely used in Anglo-Catholic parishes. However, the use of The English Missal continues in a small number of liturgically traditional Anglican parish churches in England and the United States. In 2021, The English Missal'' was adopted by the Oxford English Missal Society, which has since organized Masses according to the missal at Pusey House and elsewhere in the Oxford area.

Current use

Church of England

Episcopal Church (United States)

Anglican Church of Australia

See also

 Anglican Breviary
 Anglican Missal

References

External links
 Bibliography of The English Missal, Compiled by Paul Goings, Richard J. Mammana, and W. Steven Woodward
 Order of Mass in the English Missal (English and Latin)
 Propers of the English Missal

1933 non-fiction books
20th-century Christian texts
Anglican liturgy
Anglican missals
Anglo-Catholicism
Missals
Anglican liturgical books